Mianos (in Aragonese: both Mians) is a municipality located in the province of Zaragoza, Aragon, Spain. According to the 2004 census (INE), the municipality has a population of 45 inhabitants.

References

External links 
 Página web de Mianos

Municipalities in the Province of Zaragoza